The Chevron B16 was a Group 4 sports prototype race car, designed, developed, and built in 1969 by the British racing car manufacturer Chevron Cars as a two-seater racing sports car for the makes world championship. Brian Redman won the very first outing, the  race at the Nürburgring on September 7, 1969, at a time of 3:13:01.6 hours. The last victory with a Chevron B16 was achieved by Clemens Schickentanz on July 11, 1971, in the sports car race at the Norisring.

Design and versions

As with the previous B8, Derek Bennett (1933–1978) used a lattice tube construction with stiffening sheets of steel and aluminum for the chassis. The chassis with double wishbones on all wheels corresponded to the usual. Derek Bennett also designed the fiberglass body, which was manufactured by Specialized Moldings. The first cars were powered by a 1.6 liter Ford Cosworth FVA engine from Formula 2. A displacement increased to 1790 cc resulted in a higher performance of 235 bhp (175 kW) at 8750 min -1 in this engine. 18 copies of this engine were delivered to Chevron, later a BMW M-10 engine with 2 liters capacity and a Mazda Wankel engine were also used. A total of 23 Chevron B16s were built, which is considered one of the most beautiful Chevron sports cars. In 2013, a Chevron B16 sold for just under £270,000 at an auction in London. Kit car replicas of the Chevron B16 were offered in the 1990s.

B16 Spyder
As a one-off, the single-seater and open Chevron B16 Spyder with a 1790 cc Cosworth engine was also successfully used by Brian Redman in the 2-liter class of the European Sports Car Championship in 1970.

500 km race at the Nürburgring

The favorites for the 1969  race at the Nürburgring were three Abarths, a prototype, and two sports cars, with drivers Johannes Ortner, Toine Hezemans, and Gijs van Lennep, who were already setting such good times on Friday that they skipped Saturday practice. But on Saturday, Brian Redman in the new 1.6-liter Chevron B16 set a lap of 8:33.5, 5.6 seconds faster than Hezeman's two-liter Abarth. In the race, Redman led from start to finish and set the fastest lap of 8:40.4 minutes. Places two to five were taken by the Abarth drivers Hezemans, von Lennep and Ortner and Herbert Schultzeon Alfa Romeo Tipo 33. In contrast to long-distance races, the drivers completed the 500 kilometers without being relieved.

Specifications

Chevron B16 BMW (1969-1970)

Engine: BMW M10, in-line four-cylinder
Displacement: 
Bore × Stroke: ×
Performance	220 hp (160 kW) at 7800 rpm
Max. Torque:  @ 6630 rpm
Mixture preparation	Carburettor Weber 45 DCOE
Transmission: 5-speed gearbox, Hewland FT-200
rear wheel drive
Body: Glass-fiber reinforced plastic (fiberglass)
Front suspension: Double wishbone
Rear suspension: Inverted lower wishbone, upper wishbone,
upper and lower diagonal link
Steering: Rack and pinion steering
Brakes Discs: Ø front: , rear: 
Wheelbase: 
Wheel size:	Front: 8.2/20×13, Rear: 13.0/25.5×13
Dimensions: L × W × H 4113×1680×920mm
Curb weight:

References

Chevron racing cars
Sports prototypes
24 Hours of Le Mans race cars
Group 4 (racing) cars
Sports racing cars